Lohan is a village in the Narowal District of Punjab province of Pakistan. It is located at 32°14'0N 74°51'0E with an altitude of 245 metres (807 feet). Neighbouring settlements include Depoke, Nonar and Tapyala

References

Villages in Narowal District